The  is a toy and Japanese anime franchise begun by toy company Tomy in Japan. Tomy struck a cooperative deal with the animation studio Sunrise (known for its mecha series, most notably Gundam) to develop the new franchise to sell their toys.

Series overview
  (April 1991–March 1992)
  (April 1992–February 1993)
  (March 1993–February 1994)
  (2002, cancelled)

Kanzen Shouri Daiteioh was planned to be made into a TV series, but instead only a pilot episode OVA and a manga based on the pilot was made. However, this series appears in Super Robot Wars NEO.

Series summaries and context
The robots are suddenly entrusted to primary school children by patron saint "Eldran". They control the robots by co-operating, and confront the invaders who attempt to take over the Earth.
The idea was that a school (or various places in a large town) could house the large transforming robots and their base would be the school that the kids would go to.

Similarities with Yūsha
When the Eldran series was conceived by Tomy, Takara (who would later merge with Tomy) had begun making the Brave series (Yūsha series in Japan). The robots in each series would combine in certain ways to become a powerful robot and later new robots would be introduced that could combine with the title robot. When Takara and Tomy merged into TakaraTomy, the similarities between the two franchises led to Raijin-Oh being featured in the PlayStation 2 video game Brave Wars alongside several Brave characters.

 
Toy brands
Transforming toy robots
Sunrise (company)
Bandai Namco franchises
Takara Tomy franchises
Super robot anime and manga